The 2016–17 Bethune–Cookman Wildcats men's basketball team represented Bethune-Cookman University during the 2016–17 NCAA Division I men's basketball season. The Wildcats, led by sixth-year head coach Gravelle Craig, played their home games at the Moore Gymnasium in Daytona Beach, Florida as members of the Mid-Eastern Athletic Conference. They finished the season 10–22, 6–10 in MEAC play to finish in tenth place. They defeated Delaware State before losing in the quarterfinals of the MEAC tournament to North Carolina Central.

On March 20, 2017, it was announced that head coach Gravelle Craig's contract would not be renewed. He finished at Bethune–Cookman with a six-year record of 74–123. The Wildcats hired Ryan Ridder from Daytona State of the NJCAA as the new head coach on March 31.

Previous season
The Wildcats finished the 2015–16 season 14–18, 10–6 in MEAC play to finish in fourth place. They lost in the quarterfinals of the MEAC tournament to Savannah State.

Preseason 
The Wildcats were picked to finish sixth in the MEAC preseason poll. Jordan Potts was selected the All-MEAC preseason first team.

Roster

Schedule and results

|-
!colspan=9 style=| Regular season

|-
!colspan=9 style=| MEAC tournament

References

Bethune–Cookman Wildcats men's basketball seasons
Bethune-Cookman